The Hon. Lilian Helen "Lily" Montagu, CBE (22 December 1873 – 22 January 1963) was the first woman to play a major role in Progressive Judaism.

Life
Lily Montagu was the sixth of 10 children born to Ellen Cohen Montagu (1843–1919) and Samuel Montagu (1832–1911).  Her father, founder of the merchant bank that bore his name, was a self-made millionaire by 1871. He was a Liberal politician who sat in the House of Commons from 1885 to 1900 as the MP for Whitechapel, a poor district of the East End of London. In 1907, Montagu was raised to the peerage as Baron Swaythling.

She grew up in a pious Orthodox Jewish home, in an ethos of privilege and philanthropy, devoted to helping the poor and advancing Jewish institutions. Her eldest brother, Louis, was also a financier and political activist, founding the League of British Jews to lobby against the creation of the state of Israel. Another brother was Edwin, the Liberal politician, who married Venetia Stanley. Two cousins, a pair of brothers, also became Liberal MPs: Sir Stuart Samuel, 1st Baronet, a London Justice of the Peace, and Herbert Samuel, 1st Viscount Samuel, the High Commissioner for Palestine after the Balfour Declaration and eventually Home Secretary.  

Lily Montagu was also influenced by Claude Montefiore, a reform-oriented philanthropist and scholar. Until the age of 15, she was educated at Doreck College, and privately educated thereafter. 

In 1893 she founded with Emily Marion Harris the West Central Jewish Girls Club (which subsequently merged into the Jewish Girls' Brigade). She was active in social improvement, particularly in respect to unemployment, sweat shops and bad housing.  

In 1901 and 1902, Montagu laid the groundwork for the establishment of the Jewish Religious Union in London. In February 1902 she arranged the first meeting of the Jewish Religious Union for the Advancement of Liberal Judaism at her sister Henrietta Franklin's house. The Union set up the first synagogue in Liberal Judaism in the UK and helped found the World Union for Progressive Judaism. 

Montagu was a founding member with her sister of the Jewish League for Woman Suffrage. She sat on the executive committee and led the meetings in prayer.

Following the retirement of Leo Baeck, Montagu served for a brief stint (1955–1959) in her 80s as president of the World Union for Progressive Judaism, before handing the reins over to Solomon Freehof.

Works or publications 
 Montagu, L.H. (1899) "The Spiritual Possibilities of Judaism Today". Jewish Quarterly Review. London.
 
 Montagu, L.H. (1902) Broken Stalks. R. Brimley Johnson: London.
 Montagu, L.H. (undated – possibly 1903), The West Central Jewish Girls Club, Chapter XXII in book of unknown title. Photocopy in archive of Jewish Museum.
 Montagu, L.H. (1904) 'The girl in the background' in Urwick, E.J. (1904) Studies of Boy Life in Our Cities, J.M. Dent: London.
 Montagu, L.H. (1913) Samuel Montagu: First Baron Swaythling, Born 21 December 1832, Died 12 January 1911: A character sketch. Truslove and Hanson: London.
 Montagu, L.H. (1941) My Club and I: The Story of The West Central Jewish Club, Herbert Joseph: London.
 Montagu, L.H. (1943) The Faith of a Jewish Woman, G. Allen & Unwin: London.
 Montagu, L. (1962) 'The West Central Community' in Magnus, C. L, E.M.J.: The Man and his Work, Published for Private Circulation on behalf of the Ernest M. Joseph Memorial by Valentine, Mitchell London.
   HathiTrust Digital Library Limited view (search only)

References

Further reading

External links
 Lily Montagu (profile) at the encyclopaedia of informal education (infed) / YMCA George Williams College (UK)
 Lily Montagu (profile) at Jewish Women's Archive
 In memoriam – Lily H. Montagu, 1873–1963. at British Library

1873 births
1963 deaths
Jewish philosophers
Reform Judaism and women
English Jews
English social justice activists
Commanders of the Order of the British Empire
Daughters of barons
Liberal Judaism (United Kingdom)
Lily